Senator Carlton may refer to:

Henry Hull Carlton (1835–1905), Georgia State Senate
Lisa Carlton (born 1964), Florida State Senate
Maggie Carlton (born 1957), Nevada State Senate